Verschwende deine Zeit (Waste Your Time)  is the debut album by German rock group Silbermond, released on July 12, 2004. Primarily produced by Ingo Politz and Bernd Wendlandt, the album peaked at number 3 on the German Albums Chart and at number  in Austria, eventually receiving double platinum status in both countries. On November 11, 2004, Verschwende deine Zeit was re-released as a Special Edition.

Track listing

Charts

Weekly charts

Year-end charts

Certifications and sales

Release history

References

External links
Silbermond.de — official site

2004 debut albums
German-language albums
Silbermond albums